Pockmarks are concave, crater-like depressions on seabeds that are caused by fluids (liquids and gasses) escaping and erupting through the seafloor. They can vary in size and have been found worldwide.

Pockmarks were discovered off the coasts of Nova Scotia, Canada in the late 1960s by Lew King and Brian McLean of the Bedford Institute of Oceanography, using a new side scan sonar developed in the late 1960s by Kelvin Hughes. Before the two researchers King and McLean used the side scan sonar, they had noticed 'notches' on echo sounder and shallow seismic records in the seafloor off Nova Scotia. They believed these notches to represent gullies and curvilinear troughs in the muddy seafloor. However, they could never work out how to join these notches from one survey line to the next. It was, therefore, not before they surveyed with the area-coverage system, Side scan sonar, that they realized the notches were in fact closed depressions (craters) and not curvilinear features. This was a great surprise, because there are very few craters on the Earth's surface. 

Although pockmarks were first documented and published 50 years ago, they are currently still being discovered on the ocean floor and in many lakes, the world over. Spatial delineation and morphometric characterisation of pockmarks in the central North Sea seabed have been achieved by semi-automatic methods.

Pockmarks have been found worldwide. Discovery was aided by the use of high-resolution multibeam acoustic systems for bathymetric mapping. In these cases, pockmarks have been interpreted as the morphological expression of gas or oil leakage from active hydrocarbon system or a deep overpressured petroleum reservoir. Specifically, long term deep fluid flow resulting in pockmarks is linked to undersea methane gas escape under pressure.

See also
 Cold seeps
Limnic eruption
Demersal fish

Bibliography

References

Sedimentology
Oceanography
Lakes